The rough-legged buzzard (Europe) or rough-legged hawk (North America)(Buteo lagopus) is a medium-large bird of prey. It is found in Arctic and Subarctic regions of North America, Europe, and Russia during the breeding season and migrates south for the winter. It was traditionally also known as the rough-legged falcon in such works as John James Audubon's The Birds of America.

Nests are typically located on cliffs, bluffs or in trees. Clutch sizes are variable with food availability, but three to five eggs are usually laid. These hawks hunt over open land, feeding primarily on small mammals. Along with the kestrels, kites, and osprey, this is one of the few birds of prey to hover regularly.

Description
Among the members of the genus Buteo, it is sixth heaviest, the fifth longest, and the fourth longest winged. The plumage is predominantly brown in colour and often shows a high degree of speckling. A broad brown chest-band is present in most plumages and a square dark carpal patch contrasting with the white under-wing is an easily identifiable characteristic in light morph individuals. A wide variety of plumage patterns are exhibited in light vs. dark morphs, males vs. females and adults vs. juveniles. Extensive field experience is required to distinguish between certain plumage variations. Compared to its more common Nearctic and Palearctic cousins, the common buzzard (Buteo buteo) and the red-tailed hawk (Buteo jamaicensis), it is slightly larger, though may be outweighed by the latter.

Its feet are feathered to the toes as an adaptation to its Arctic home range. Its scientific name reflects this feature; the genus name Buteo is the Latin name of the common buzzard, and lagopus, is derived from Ancient Greek lago (λαγως), meaning "hare", and pous (πους), "foot". Its talons are relatively small, reflecting their preferred choice of prey.

Distinguishing characteristics in all plumages include long white tail feathers with one or more dark subterminal bands. The wing tips are long enough to reach or extend past the tail when the animal is perched. The common buzzard can be similar-looking, with a similar long-tailed shape and can be notoriously variable in plumage. The rough-legged is longer-winged and more eagle-like in appearance. The red-tailed hawk is chunkier-looking and differs in its darker head, broader, shorter wings, barring on the wings and the tail, dark leading edge to the wings (rather than black wrist patch) and has no white base to the tail. The ferruginous hawk is larger, with a bigger, more prominent bill and has a whitish comma at the wrist and all-pale tail.

It is the only hawk of its size (other than the very different-looking osprey) to regularly hover over one spot, by beating its wings quickly.

Taxonomy
The rough-legged buzzard is a member of the genus Buteo, a group of moderately large raptors exhibiting broad wings, short tails and wide robust bodies. This group is known as buzzards in Europe but referred to as hawks in North America.

There are at least three recognized subspecies of Buteo lagopus:
 B. l. lagopus is the nominate subspecies. It breeds in northern Europe and Asia and has relatively dark plumage. The dorsal feathers are a homogeneous brown colour, contrasting well with the paler head.
 B. l. sanctijohannis breeds in North America. It has pale, speckled dorsal plumage and is slightly smaller than B. l. lagopus.
 B. l. kamtchatkensis breeds from north Siberia to Pacific North America. It has paler plumage when compared with B. l. sanctijohannis and it is, on average, the largest of the three subspecies.

Habitat and distribution
The rough-legged hawk breeds in tundra and taiga habitats of North America and Eurasia between the latitudes of 61° and 76° N. Rough-legged hawks occurring in North America migrate to southern Canada and into the central United States for the winter, while Eurasian individuals migrate to southern Europe and Asia. It is the only member of its diverse genus found in both of the Northern continents and has a complete circumpolar distribution. During these winter months, from November to March, preferred habitats include marshes, prairies and agricultural regions where rodent prey is most abundant.

Breeding sites are usually located in areas with plenty of unforested, open ground. Depending on snow conditions, migrants arrive at breeding grounds during April and May. Home ranges vary with food supply but are commonly reported to be  during the winter, but little is known about home ranges during the breeding season. Although frequently attacked in skirmishes by other highly territorial birds such as gyrfalcons and skuas, the rough-legged hawk is not strongly territorial. However, wintering rough-legged buzzards seems to behave aggressively towards common buzzards in Sweden and both species with try to keep the other off a fixed hunting range.

Behaviour

Diet
This species is carnivorous, typically feeding on small mammals, which make up 62–98% of its diet. Lemmings and voles are the major prey items of this species, seasonally comprising up to 80–90% of their prey, but this varies with seasonal availability. Some evidence suggests that these hawks may be able to see vole scent marks which are only visible in the ultraviolet range, allowing them to cue in on prey. Despite generally preying on rodents, a 2015 paper reported the species breeding on rodent-free Kolguev Island in Arctic Russia with goslings a main prey. In the North-West of Russia, rough-legged hawks could feed on small rodents, in the years when rodent density is high, and shift for alternative prey (ptarmigans and hares) in the years when small rodents are scarce. The rough-legged hawk will also supplement its diet with mice, rats, gerbils, pikas, shrews, squirrels of the genera Spermophilus and Tamias, and insects. Besides mammals, birds are the second most favored type of prey for rough-legs. Most avian prey species are small passerines such as snow buntings (Plectrophenax nivalis), Lapland longspur (Calcarius lapponicus) and American tree sparrow (Spizelloides arborea). However, they will also prey on birds slightly larger than the passerines typically targeted, especially ptarmigan (Lagopus ssp.), as well as waterfowl, shorebirds (such as ruffs (Philomachus pugnax)) and short-eared owls (Asio flammeus). They usually target bird prey which are young and inexperienced, with relatively large avian prey often being snatched in their fledging stage. When small mammals are scarce, the rough-legged hawk will also feed on larger, medium-sized mammals including prairie dogs (Cynomys ssp.), ground squirrels, muskrats (Ondatra zibethicus), weasels (Mustela ssp.), and even adult black-tailed jackrabbits (Lepus californicus) of approximately twice their own weight. During winter, shrub-steppe habitats seem to encourage a strong dependence on rabbit prey. In developed areas of England, wintering rough-legged buzzards have been recorded preying most regularly on relatively large prey such as common wood pigeon (Columba palumbus) and invasive European rabbits (Oryctolagus cuniculus).

This avian predator hunts opportunistically, occasionally supplementing their diet with carrion, but focusing primarily on the most locally abundant small vertebrates. Rough-legged hawks will steal prey from other individuals of the same species as well as other species such as the red-tailed hawk, hen harrier (Circus cyaenus), American kestrel (Falco sparverius), and common raven (Corvus corax). These raptors hunt during the daytime. Like most Buteos, rough-legged hawks have been reported both still-hunting (watching for prey from a perch and then stooping) and watching for prey while in flight. Unlike most other large raptors, they may engage in hovering flight above the ground while search for prey.

Reproduction

Sexual maturity is reached at about two years old. Breeding generally occurs during May but is variable depending upon dates of arrival at breeding grounds. The rough-legged hawk is thought to be monogamous, mating with a single individual for multiple years. No evidence currently suggest otherwise.

Rough-legged buzzards look for suitable nesting territory not in spring, like most migratory birds, but in advance - in autumn. After the breeding season, they make long-distance prospecting flights, look for a suitable habitat with high rodent numbers, and return to that place the following year.

Nests are built soon after arrival to breeding grounds and require 3–4 weeks to complete. Twigs, sedges, and old feathers are used as building materials. Cliff ledges and rocky outcroppings are preferred nesting sites. Females can lay 1–7 eggs but will typically lay 3–5. Minimum incubation period is 31 days, provided almost exclusively by the female. The male feeds the female during this incubation period. After hatching, young require 4–6 weeks before fledging the nest. Fledglings depend on parents to provide food for 2–4 weeks after leaving the nest.

Rough-legged hawks could nest in association with Peregrine falcons (Falco peregrinus). Peregrines chasing away small rodent predators from their nesting territory and Rough-legged Hawks could use these hot spots as a nesting territory.

Longevity and mortality
Rough-legged hawks that survive to adulthood can live to an age of 19 years in the wild. One female being kept in an Idaho zoo is over 25 years of age and there is a female that is a minimum of 38 years old living in Redding, CA . However, perhaps a majority of individuals in the wild do not survive past their first two years of life. The threats faced by young rough-legs can include starvation when prey is not numerous, freezing when Northern climes are particularly harsh during brooding, destruction by humans, and predation by various animals. The chances of survival increase incrementally both when they reach the fledging stage and when they can start hunting for themselves. Death of flying immatures and adults are often the result of human activity, including collisions with power lines, buildings, and vehicles, incidental ingestion of poison or lead from prey or illegal hunting and trapping.

Most predation recorded on this species is on the young at the nest. Arctic foxes (Vulpes lagopus), brown bears (Ursus arctos), and wolverines (Gulo gulo) have all eaten eggs and young of this species if they are capable of accessing nests on foot. Avian scavengers, especially maurading groups of common ravens, will also readily prey on eggs and nestlings, as will skuas (Stercorarius ssp.). Snowy owls (Bubo scandiacus) are a potential predator at the nest as well. Adults, being a large raptorial bird, have fewer natural predators but may die in conflicts, especially if they are defending their own nests and are occasionally preyed on by other large raptorial birds. Raptors who prey on rough-legged hawks of most ages at varied times of year may include numerous eagles (especially the golden eagle (Aquila chrysaetos), though also sometimes other Aquila in Eurasia and seldom Haliaeetus eagles) as well as large falcons. While wintering, rough-legged buzzards or hawks may be vulnerable to predation by night to Eurasian eagle-owls (Bubo bubo) or great horned owls (Bubo virginianus) and rarely, during day, other large Buteo hawks, including those of their own species.

Besides predation, it could be other reasons for nestling mortality among rough-legged buzzards. Nestlings in their first two weeks have a lousy temperature regulation. In the tundra landscape, they nest on the ground and during hot weather, they could go out of the nest seeking shelter from the sun. If weather then rapidly changes to the thunderstorm (which is common in the Arctic) nestlings could die without parent protection in a short time in 3–5 m from the nest. Other reasons for nestling mortality are earth-slides of the river-banks, where rough-legged buzzards often build their nests, and chilling.

Vocalization
Adult rough-legged hawks will vocalize alarm calls when intruders approach a nesting site. It is described as a downward slurring whistle, sounding like kiu wiyuk or a lengthy descending kee-eer similar to that of the red-tailed hawk. This cry is given in flight or from a perch every 15–30 seconds. During courtship, both sexes have been recorded to give a whistling sound that changes to a hiss. Following copulation, females will give a cluck-like sound and males vocalize a whistling noise. Fledglings will give begging calls while waiting for parents to provide food.

References

External links

 Rough-legged hawk – Buteo lagopus – USGS Patuxent Bird Identification InfoCenter
 Rough-legged hawk Species Account – Cornell Lab of Ornithology
 Stamps: rough-legged hawk at bird-stamps.org
 How to ID a rough-legged hawk video
 Rough-legged Hawk video
 
 

Buteo
Holarctic birds
Fauna of Siberia
Birds described in 1763
Taxa named by Erik Pontoppidan